Taft Airport , also known as Taft-Kern County Airport, is a public airport located  east of Taft, serving Kern County, California, USA. It is home to a skydive operation known as Skydive Taft.

Runway 07 is marked with a runway-width X. Landings on 07 are not allowed; landings on 25 are allowed, and takeoffs from 07 and 25 are allowed.

See also
 List of airports in Kern County, California

References

External links 

Airports in Kern County, California